By the Sword! is a 1982 board game published by The Legionnaire .

Gameplay
By the Sword! is a game purported to be derived from a late Dark Ages poem by a Nordic ruler named Bendigeid, which describes a battle in the form of a wargame complete with rules.

Reception
Fred Askew reviewed By the Sword! in The Space Gamer No. 58. Askew commented that "If you would like to include large battles in your FRP world and don't mind learning a fairly complex new game system, look at this title. If you are not interested in large battles, or don't want to learn any involved rules, this is not for you. I recommend that anyone interested in fantasy should at least look this game over. It's not perfect, but a great deal of work has gone into it."

References

Board games introduced in 1982